Alfredo Arturo Jadresic Vargas (18 September 1925 – 30 September 2021) was a Chilean scientist and professor of medicine. As a high jumper he competed in the 1948 Summer Olympics, and placed ninth.

Personal life
Jadresic was born in Iquique in September 1925. He came from a family of Croatian origin. He died in Santiago on 1st October 2021, at the age of 96. According to another source the date was the 30th September.

Medical career
Jadresic got his Doctorate in medicine and was a professor of medicine at the University of Chile, and then Dean of Medicine from 1968 to 1972. In September 1973, after the coup d'état, he was arrested and spent 51 days in the National Stadium of Chile, but was released with no charges but forced to leave the country. He spent his exile in the Royal Sussex Hospital in Hastings, England. When democracy was restored he returned to Chile, where he specialized in endocrinology at the University of Chile.

References

1925 births
2021 deaths
Chilean scientists
Chilean people of Croatian descent
Olympic athletes of Chile
Athletes (track and field) at the 1948 Summer Olympics
Chilean male high jumpers
Chilean expatriates in the United Kingdom
People from Iquique